Ștefănești may refer to:

Places in Moldova
Ștefănești, Florești, a commune in the Florești District, Moldova
Ștefănești, Ștefan Vodă, a commune in the Ștefan Vodă District, Moldova
Ștefănești, a village in the Tănătarii Noi Commune, Căușeni District, Moldova

Places in Romania
Ștefănești, Argeș, a town in Argeș County, Romania
Ștefănești, Botoșani, a town in Botoșani County, Romania
Ștefănești, Vâlcea, a commune in Vâlcea County, Romania
Ștefănești, a village in Suseni Commune, Argeș County, Romania
Ștefănești, a village in Ileana Commune, Călărași County, Romania
Ștefănești, a village in Târgu Cărbunești Town, Gorj County, Romania
Ștefănești, a former village in Ghindari Commune, Mureș County, Romania
Ștefănești, a former village in Darova Commune, Timiș County, Romania
Ștefănești, a village in Măciuca Commune, Vâlcea County, Romania
Ștefăneștii de Jos, a commune in Ilfov County, and its village of Ștefăneștii de Sus, Romania

Place in Ukraine
Ștefănești, the Romanian name for Stepanivka village, Prylypche, Chernivtsi Oblast

See also 
 Ștefan (name)
 Ștefănescu (surname)
 Ștefania (name)